In archaeogenetics, the term Eastern Hunter-Gatherer (EHG), sometimes East European Hunter-Gatherer, or Eastern European Hunter-Gatherer is the name given to a distinct ancestral component that represents descent from Mesolithic hunter-gatherers of Eastern Europe.

The Eastern Hunter Gatherer genetic profile can be modeled as an admixture between a Siberian Paleolithic population called Ancient North Eurasians (ANE) with European Western Hunter-Gatherers (WHG), although the relationship between the ANE and EHG ancestral components is not yet well understood due to lack of samples that could bridge the spatiotemporal gap.

During the Mesolithic, the EHGs inhabited an area stretching from the Baltic Sea to the Urals and downwards to the Pontic–Caspian steppe. Along with Scandinavian Hunter-Gatherers (SHG) and Western Hunter-Gatherers (WHG), the EHGs constituted one of the three main genetic groups in the postglacial period of early Holocene Europe. The border between WHGs and EHGs ran roughly from the lower Danube, northward along the western forests of the Dnieper towards the western Baltic Sea.

During the Neolithic and early Eneolithic, likely during the 4th millennium BC EHGs on the Pontic–Caspian steppe mixed with Caucasus hunter-gatherers (CHGs) with the resulting population, almost half-EHG and half-CHG, forming the genetic cluster known as Western Steppe Herder (WSH). WSH populations closely related to the people of the Yamnaya culture are supposed to have embarked on a massive migration leading to the spread of Indo-European languages throughout large parts of Eurasia.

Research
Haak et al. (2015) identified the Eastern Hunter-Gatherers (EHG) as a distinct genetic cluster in two males only. The EHG male of Samara (dated to ca. 5650-5550 BC) carried Y-haplogroup R1b1a1a* and mt-haplogroup U5a1d. The other EHG male, buried in Karelia (dated to ca. 5500-5000 BC) carried Y-haplogroup R1a1 and mt-haplogoup C1g. The authors of the study also identified a Western Hunter-Gatherer (WHG) cluster and a Scandinavian Hunter-Gatherer (SHG) cluster, intermediate between WHG and EHG. 
Also Lazaridis et al. (2016) confirmed SHGs to be a mix of EHGs and WHGs.

They suggested that EHGs harbored mixed ancestry from Ancient North Eurasians (ANEs) and WHGs. The people of the Yamnaya culture were found to be a mix of EHG and a "Near Eastern related population". During the 3rd millennium BC, the Yamnaya people embarked on a massive expansion throughout Europe, which significantly altered the genetic landscape of the continent. The expansion gave rise to cultures such as Corded Ware, and was possibly the source of the distribution of Indo-European languages in Europe.

EHGs may have mixed with "an Armenian-like Near Eastern source", which formed the Yamnaya culture, as early as the Eneolithic (5200-4000 BC). Researchers have found that EHGs may have derived different amounts of their ancestry from WHGs and ANEs. Their relationship to the WHG and ANE is not well clarified.

The people of the Mesolithic Kunda culture and the Narva culture of the eastern Baltic were a mix of WHG and EHG, showing the closest affinity with WHG. Samples from the Ukrainian Mesolithic and Neolithic were found to cluster tightly together between WHG and EHG, suggesting genetic continuity in the Dnieper Rapids for a period of 4,000 years. The Ukrainian samples belonged exclusively to the maternal haplogroup U, which is found in around 80% of all European hunter-gatherer samples.

The people of the Pit–Comb Ware culture (PCW/CCC) of the eastern Baltic bear 65% EHG ancestry. This is in contrast to earlier hunter-gatherers in the area, who were more closely related to WHG. This was demonstrated using a sample of Y-DNA extracted from a Pit–Comb Ware individual. This belonged to R1a15-YP172. The four samples of mtDNA extracted constituted two samples of U5b1d1, one sample of U5a2d, and one sample of U4a.

Günther et al. (2018) analyzed 13 SHGs and found all of them to be of EHG ancestry. Generally, SHGs from western and northern Scandinavia had more EHG ancestry (ca 49%) than individuals from eastern Scandinavia (ca. 38%). The authors suggested that the SHGs were a mix of WHGs who had migrated into Scandinavia from the south, and EHGs who had later migrated into Scandinavia from the northeast along the Norwegian coast. SHGs displayed higher frequences of genetic variants that cause light skin (SLC45A2 and SLC24A5), and light eyes (OCA/Herc2), than WHGs and EHGs.

Members of the Kunda culture and Narva culture were also found to be more closely related with WHG, while the Pit–Comb Ware culture was more closely related to EHG. Northern and eastern areas of the eastern Baltic were found to be more closely related to EHG than southern areas. The study noted that EHGs, like SHGs and Baltic hunter-gatherers, carried high frequencies of the derived alleles for SLC24A5 and SLC45A2, which are codings for light skin.

Mathieson et al. (2018) analyzed the genetics of a large number of skeletons of prehistoric Eastern Europe. Thirty-seven samples were from Mesolithic and Neolithic Ukraine (9500-6000 BC). These were classified as intermediate between EHG and SHG. The males belonged exclusively to R haplotypes (particularly subclades of R1b1 and R1a) and I haplotypes (particularly subclades of I2). Mitochondrial DNA belonged almost exclusively to U (particularly subclades of U5 and U4).

A large number of individuals from the Zvejnieki burial ground, which mostly belonged to the Kunda culture and Narva culture in the eastern Baltic, were analyzed. These individuals were mostly of WHG descent in the earlier phases, but over time EHG ancestry became predominant. The Y-DNA of this site belonged almost exclusively to haplotypes of haplogroup R1b1a1a and I2a1. The mtDNA belonged exclusively to haplogroup U (particularly subclades of U2, U4 and U5).

Forty individuals from three sites of the Iron Gates Mesolithic in the Balkans were estimated to be of 85% WHG and 15% EHG descent. The males at these sites carried exclusively R1b1a and I (mostly subclades of I2a) haplotypes. mtDNA belonged mostly to U (particularly subclades of U5 and U4).

People of the Cucuteni–Trypillia culture were found to harbor about 20% hunter-gatherer ancestry, which was intermediate between EHG and WHG.

Narasimshan et al. (2019) coined a new ancestral component, West Siberian Hunter-Gatherer (WSHG). WSHGs contained about 30% EHG ancestry, 50% ANE ancestry, and 20% East Asian ancestry.

Unlike the Yamnaya culture, in the Dnieper–Donets culture no Caucasian Hunter-Gatherer (CHG) or Early European Farmer (EEF) ancestry has been detected. Dnieper-Donets males and Yamnaya males carry the same paternal haplogroups (R1b and I2a), suggesting that the CHG and EEF admixture among the Yamnaya came through EHG males mixing with EEF and CHG females. According to David W. Anthony, this suggests that the Indo-European languages were initially spoken by EHGs living in Eastern Europe.

Physical appearance
The EHGs are suggested to have had mostly brown eyes and light skin, with "intermediate frequencies of the blue-eye variants" and "high frequencies of the light-skin variants." Another EHG from Samara was predicted to be light skinned, and was determined to have a high probability of being blue-eyed with a light hair shade, with a 75% calculated probability of being blond-haired.

The rs12821256 allele of the KITLG gene that controls melanocyte development and melanin synthesis, which is associated with blond hair and first found in an individual from Siberia dated to around 15,000 BC, is found in three Eastern Hunter-Gatherers from Samara, Motala and Ukraine.

See also
 Dnieper-Donets culture
 Sredny Stog culture
 Deriivka
 Samara culture
 Khvalynsk culture

References

Bibliography

Further reading

 
 

 

Archaeogenetic lineages
Genetic history of Europe
Peopling of the world
Indo-European genetics
Last Glacial Maximum
Mesolithic cultures of Europe